The 2004 V8 Supercar Championship Series was an Australian racing series for V8 Supercars. It began on 21 March 2004 at the Adelaide Street Circuit and ended on 5 December at Eastern Creek Raceway after 13 rounds. It was the sixth running of the V8 Supercar Championship Series. The series winner was also awarded the 45th Australian Touring Car Championship title by the Confederation of Australian Motor Sport.

The championship was won by Marcos Ambrose of the Stone Brothers Racing.

Teams and drivers
 
 
The following drivers and teams competed in the 2004 V8 Supercar Championship Series. The series comprised eleven sprint rounds and two endurance rounds (the Sandown 500 and the Bathurst 1000) with each car driven by two drivers in the endurance rounds.

* = Drove in Sandown 500 only

** = Drove in Bathurst 1000 only

Results and standings

Race calendar
The 2004 V8 Supercar Championship Series comprised 13 rounds which included 11 sprint rounds and two endurance rounds.

Drivers championship

See also
2004 V8 Supercar season

References

External links
 Official V8 Supercar site
 2004 Racing Results Archive 
 2004 V8 Supercar Championship Series images Retrieved from motorsport.com on 8 November 2008

Supercars Championship seasons
V8 Supercar Championship Series